Judy Esmond (born 27 January 1960 in Perth, Western Australia) is a former Australian cricket player. Esmond played for the Western Australian women's cricket team between 1982 and 1987, and played three One Day Internationals for the Australia national women's cricket team.

References

External links
 Judy Esmond at southernstars.org.au

Living people
1960 births
Sportswomen from Western Australia
Australia women One Day International cricketers